The Women's 100m Freestyle event at the 11th FINA World Aquatics Championships was swum 28 – 29 July 2005 in Montreal, Quebec, Canada. Preliminary heats and Semifinal heats were 28 July; the final was 29 July.

At the start of the event, the existing World and Championships records were:
WR: 53.52, Jodie Henry (Australia), swum 18 August 2004 in Athens, Greece
CR: 54.01, Le Jingyi (China), swum 5 September 1994 in Rome, Italy

Results

Preliminaries

Semifinals

Final

References
Women's 100m Freestyle results (Prelims), from the 2005 FINA World Championships. Published by OmegaTiming.com (official timer of the 2005 Worlds); Retrieved 2010-02-07.
Women's 100m Freestyle results (Semifinals), from the 2005 FINA World Championships. Published by OmegaTiming.com (official timer of the 2005 Worlds); Retrieved 2010-02-07.
Women's 100m Freestyle results (Final), from the 2005 FINA World Championships. Published by OmegaTiming.com (official timer of the 2005 Worlds); Retrieved 2010-02-07.

Swimming at the 2005 World Aquatics Championships
2005 in women's swimming